The International Skating Union has organised the World Single Distances Speed Skating Championships for Women since 1996.

Locations
 1996: Hamar, Norway
 1997: Warsaw, Poland
 1998: Calgary, Canada
 1999: Heerenveen, Netherlands
 2000: Nagano, Japan
 2001: Salt Lake City, United States
 2002 Not held because of the Winter Olympic Games
 2003: Berlin, Germany
 2004: Seoul, South Korea
 2005: Inzell, Germany
 2006 Not held because of the Winter Olympic Games
 2007: Salt Lake City, United States
 2008: Nagano, Japan
 2009: Vancouver, Canada
 2010 Not held because of the Winter Olympic Games
 2011: Inzell, Germany
 2012: Heerenveen, Netherlands
 2013: Sochi, Russia
 2014 Not held because of the Winter Olympic Games
 2015: Heerenveen, Netherlands
 2016: Kolomna, Russia
 2017: Gangneung, South Korea
 2018 Not held because of the Winter Olympic Games
 2019: Inzell, Germany
 2020: Salt Lake City, United States
 2021: Heerenveen, Netherlands
 2022 Not held because of the Winter Olympic Games
 2023: Heerenveen, Netherlands

Medal winners

500 m

Source: schaatsstatistieken.nl 

Medal table

1,000 m

Source: schaatsstatistieken.nl 

Medal table

1,500 m

Source: schaatsstatistieken.nl 

Medal table

3,000 m

Source: schaatsstatistieken.nl 

Medal table

5,000 m

Source: schaatsstatistieken.nl 

Medal table

Mass start

Source: schaatsstatistieken.nl 

Medal table

Team pursuit

Source: schaatsstatistieken.nl 

Medal table

Team sprint

Source: schaatsstatistieken.nl 

Medal table

Medal summary
Updated after the 2023 World Championships.

Nations

World champions

Silver medalists

Bronze medalists

References

Single
Recurring sporting events established in 1996